The 2013–14 Omaha Mavericks men's basketball team represented the University of Nebraska at Omaha during the 2013–14 NCAA Division I men's basketball season. The Mavericks, led by ninth year head coach Derrin Hansen, played their home games at the Ralston Arena and were members of The Summit League. They finished the season 17–15, 5–9 in The Summit League play to finish in sixth place. As part of their transition from Division II to Division I, they were ineligible for the NCAA Tournament, and thus The Summit League Tournament because its champion receives an NCAA Tournament bid. On March 11, 2014, it was announced that the Mavericks would play in the CollegeInsider.com Tournament, hosting a first round game. This made the Mavericks the first men's basketball team to play in any postseason tournament while still in the transition process to Division I. They defeated North Dakota in the first round before losing in the second round to Murray State.

Roster

Schedule

|-
!colspan=9 style="background:#000000; color:#cc0000;"| Regular season

|-
!colspan=9 style="background:#000000; color:#cc0000;"| CIT

References

Omaha Mavericks men's basketball seasons
Omaha
Omaha Mavericks men's basketball team
Omaha Mavericks men's basketball team
Omaha